Auckland Future is a centre-right political ticket that ran for local seats under the Auckland Council in 2016. It campaigned on a fiscally conservative platform. It did not stand candidates in the 2019 election.

Policies 
Auckland Future has a four-point policy for a fiscally conservative Auckland. It consists of the following pledges;
 Keeping rates low
 Cutting waste
 Reducing staff costs
 Getting debt under control
The ticket was formed in order to combat dissatisfaction with the status quo in the Auckland Council while under Mayor Len Brown, who served two terms 2010–16. Auckland Future's aims were to ensure that rates are kept low and that the council could be held accountable by those who elected them for any pledges it committed to.

Many National Party members supported the ticket, and given that National does not run candidates in local body elections, the support from its members was an indication of the party's support for Auckland Future. Like the National Party, Auckland Future intends to be a fiscally conservative ticket and much of the policy is ideologically aligned with the National Party.

Auckland Future ran a region-wide campaign in the lead up to the 2016 Auckland local elections, but secured few seats. In March 2019, it announced that it would not field candidates at the 2019 election.

Former Representatives

Local Boards 
 Danielle Grant – Kaipātiki Local Board - stood in 2019 under Shore Action
 Bernie Diver – Maungakiekie Subdivision: Maungakiekie-Tamaki Local Board
 Debbie Leaver – Maungakiekie Subdivision: Maungakiekie-Tamaki Local Board
 Lisa Whyte – Upper Harbour Local Board (Chair) - stood in 2019 as an independent

Councillors 
 Denise Lee – Maungakiekie-Tamaki ward – resigned after being elected MP for Maungakiekie at the 2017 general election

Local boards 
 Mark Davey – Waitematā Local Board

Election results

Structure 
Auckland Future is governed by a by a 10-member board, which in 2017 was made up of: Peter Tong (Chair), Leilua Pulotu Lui Alofa, Joseph Bergin, Jo Bransgrove, Alan Dormer, Murray Higgs, Beth O'Loughlin, Darren Ward, Jenny Wang QSM, and Sue Wood.

References 

Conservative parties in New Zealand
Political groupings in New Zealand
Politics of the Auckland Region